is the Japanese word for bamboo flute, and refers to a class of flutes native to Japan.  come in many varieties, but are generally high-pitched and made of a bamboo called .

Categorization 
 are traditionally broken up into two basic categories – the transverse flute and the end-blown flute. Transverse flutes are held to the side, with the musician blowing across a hole near one end; end-blown flutes are held vertically and the musician blows into one end.

History
The  instrument eventually made its way over to Japan from China in the 5th century, becoming prevalent during the Nara Period.

Modern  performance may feature a soloist or involve either a chamber or large ensemble of the instruments.

Instruments
Japanese  include many different varieties of Japanese flute, including the following:

References

External links
 

Japanese musical instruments
Bamboo flutes